Jaroslav Jágr (born February 9, 1984) is a Czech professional ice hockey goaltender. He played with HC České Budějovice in the Czech Extraliga during the 2010–11 Czech Extraliga season.

References

External links

1984 births
Living people
BK Mladá Boleslav players
Czech ice hockey goaltenders
Motor České Budějovice players
LHK Jestřábi Prostějov players
Czech expatriate ice hockey people
Expatriate ice hockey players in France
Czech expatriate sportspeople in France
IHC Písek players